Tiga or TIGA may refer to:

People
 Tiga (musician) (born 1974), Canadian musician
 Tiga, pseudonym of Haitian artist Jean-Claude Garoute
 Tiga Angelina, Indian politician
 Tiga Bayles (1953–2016), Australian radio presenter
 Adriana Aparecida Costa (born 1983), Brazilian football and futsal player

Places
 Tiga Dam, a dam in Nigeria
 Tiga Island, a small Melanesian island in the Loyalty Islands of New Caledonia
Tiga Airport
 Tiga Island, Malaysia

Other uses
 Texas Instruments Graphics Architecture (TIGA)
 The Independent Games Developers Association (TIGA)
 Tiga Race Cars, a racing car manufacturer
 Ultraman Tiga, a Japanese tokusatsu TV show

See also

Tiger (disambiguation)
Taiga, a biome characterized by coniferous forests
Tigas, a group of independent pharmacies in Malaysia